Tapoa II (1806–1860) was the king of the Tahitian island of Bora Bora from 1831 to 1860.

Tapoa II was born in 1806. He was the son of Tapoa I, King of Tahaʻa and Bora Bora, by his wife, Ai-mata. He married Pōmare IV in December 1822. This marriage was childless and ended in divorce in 1834.
Later, he married Tapoa Vahine.

Ancestry

References 

*

People from Bora Bora
1806 births
1860 deaths
Oceanian monarchs
French Polynesian royalty
Converts to Protestantism from pagan religions